John Maurice "Deac" Sanders (born January 11, 1950 in Chicago, Illinois) is a former American football defensive back in the National Football League. Sanders played college football at South Dakota. He was signed by the New England Patriots as an undrafted free agent in 1974 and played with them for 3 years, first as a cornerback and then as a free safety. Sanders then replaced Bill Bradley (American football) as the starting free safety for the Philadelphia Eagles in 1977, Dick Vermeil's second year as the Eagle head coach, and also in 1978. But in 1979, his final year, he played only one game, replaced by Brenard Wilson.

Personal
Sanders was a schoolteacher when the Patriots signed him in 1974.

External links
New England Patriots bio

1950 births
Living people
American football cornerbacks
American football safeties
South Dakota Coyotes football players
New England Patriots players
Philadelphia Eagles players